The 2012 International Championship was a professional ranking snooker tournament that took place between 28 October and 4 November 2012 at the Sichuan International Tennis Center in Chengdu, China. It was the fourth ranking event of the 2012/2013 season. It was named as the "first overseas 'major'", as the tournament had the same level of ranking points as the UK Championship.

Judd Trump won the third ranking title of his career by defeating Neil Robertson 10–8 in the final. Trump also became the world number one as a result of reaching the final.

Prize fund
The breakdown of prize money for this year is shown below:

Winner: £125,000
Runner-up: £62,500
Semi-final: £30,000
Quarter-final: £17,500
Last 16: £12,000
Last 32: £7,000
Last 48: £3,000
Last 64: £1,500

Non-televised highest break: £500
Televised highest break: £2,000
Total: £600,000

Wildcard round
These matches were played in Chengdu on 28 and 29 October 2012.

Main draw

Final

Qualifying
These matches took place between 19 and 22 August 2012 at the World Snooker Academy in Sheffield, England.

Century breaks

Qualifying stage centuries

 143, 108  Andrew Higginson
 136  Dominic Dale
 134, 102  David Gilbert
 132  Barry Hawkins
 130, 121  Aditya Mehta
 129  Tian Pengfei
 125  Barry Pinches
 123  Dechawat Poomjaeng
 121  Daniel Wells
 120, 114  Anthony McGill
 119  Jamie Burnett
 119  Marco Fu

 117, 115, 113, 105  Pankaj Advani
 117  Li Yan
 113  Scott Donaldson
 112  Andy Hicks
 109  Ian Burns
 108  Passakorn Suwannawat
 104  Rod Lawler
 104  Zhang Anda
 103  Paul Davison
 102, 102  Michael White
 101  Liam Highfield
 101  Jamie Jones

Televised stage centuries

 142, 137, 118, 115, 100  Neil Robertson
 138  Mark Davis
 134  Lu Ning
 132  Robert Milkins
 129, 108, 103  Shaun Murphy
 129  Aditya Mehta
 128, 103  Ding Junhui
 124, 121, 104  Mark Allen

 119, 118, 107  Judd Trump
 118, 102  Stephen Maguire
 113  Ricky Walden
 111  Zhao Xintong
 110  Cao Yupeng
 108  Dominic Dale
 106  Peter Ebdon

References

2012
International Championship
International Championship
Sport in Chengdu